Lamia bint Majid Al Saud is a Saudi royal and philanthropist who is Secretary General of Alwaleed Philanthropies and a United Nations Goodwill Ambassador.

Biography
Princess Lamia is the daughter of Prince Majed bin Saud, who is the son of King Saud bin Abdulaziz AlSaud. She graduated in 2001 with a BA in Public Relations & Marketing from Misr International University in Cairo. In 2003 she began a publishing company called Sada Al Arab, which published three magazines. In 2010 her novel, Children & Blood, was published which discussed honour killings and women's rights in the Middle East.

In 2016 she was appointed Secretary General of Alwaleed Philanthropies. She had previously held the role of Executive Manager of Media & Communications there. Under her leadership the foundation has enabled new opportunities for women in Saudi Arabia, including supporting the training of women ride-share drivers and enabling employment for women law graduates. 

In September 2019 she opened a new Islamic art department at the Louvre. The department exhibits 3,000 pieces that were collected from Spain to India via the Arabian peninsula, dating from the 7th to the 19th centuries.

In 2020 she was appointed a UN-Habitat Goodwill Ambassador, with a brief to support "sustainable urbanisation".

Awards
 Honorary medal from the Vice-President of Laos Phankham Viphavanh (2017)
 Achievement in Philanthropies Award - Arab Women of the Year (2017)
 Baden Powell Fellowship - World Scout Foundation (2018)
 Most influential figure - Arab Council for Social Responsibility (2021)

References

External links 
 Arab News: Princess Lamia Bint Majed Al-Saud (film)
 Khaleej Times: 'The hardest thing in life is to know who you really are': HRH Princess Lamia Bint Majid Al Saud (interview)
 Judge Business School: HRH Princess Lamia Bint Majed Saud AlSaud in conversation with Badr Jafar

Living people
Year of birth missing (living people)
Lamia
Lamia
Lamia
United Nations goodwill ambassadors
Women philanthropists
Women writers (modern period)